Public expenditure on health in the Gambia was at 1.8% of the GDP in 2004, whereas private expenditure was at 5.0%. There were 11 physicians per 100,000 persons in the early 2000s. Life expectancy at birth was 59.9 for females in 2005 and for males 57.7.

According to the World Health Organization in 2005, an estimated 78.3% of Gambian girls and women have suffered female genital mutilation.

The 2010 maternal mortality rate per 100,000 births for Gambia is 400. This is compared with 281.3 in 2008 and 628.5 in 1990. The under-5 mortality rate, per 1,000 births, is 106 and the neonatal mortality, as a percentage of under-5 mortality, is 31. In Gambia, the number of midwives per 1,000 live births is five and the lifetime risk of death for pregnant women is one in 49.

The Human Rights Measurement Initiative finds that Gambia is fulfilling 63.7% of what it should be fulfilling for the right to health based on its level of income. When looking at the right to health with respect to children, Gambia achieves 93.9% of what is expected based on its current income. In regards to the right to health amongst the adult population, the country achieves only 83.4% of what is expected based on the nation's level of income.  Gambia falls into the "very bad" category when evaluating the right to reproductive health because the nation is fulfilling only 13.8% of what the nation is expected to achieve based on the resources (income) it has available.

Vaccination

In October 2012, it was reported that the Gambia had made significant improvements in polio, measles immunisation, and the PCV-7 vaccine.

The Gambia was certified as polio-free in 2004. "The Gambia EPI program is one of the best in the World Health Organization African Region," Thomas Sukwa, a representative of the WHO, said, according to the Foroyaa newspaper. "It is indeed gratifying to note that the government of the Gambia remains committed to the global polio eradication initiative."

According to Vaccine News Daily:

 The Gambia is tied for third place in Africa for measles immunisation among one-year-old children.
 The Gambia is tied for fourth place in the world for the DTP3 immunisation for one-year-old children.
 The Gambia is ranked second in Africa for "feverish children under the age of five who received antimalarial treatment, according to Trading Economics."

Healthcare
There are 4 referral hospitals operated by the government: The Edward Francis Small Teaching Hospital in Banjul and smaller hospitals at Bansang, Farafenni and Bwiam. There are 8 main health centres and a further 16 smaller centres.

A group called Power Up Gambia operates in the Gambia to provide solar power technology to health care facilities, ensuring greater access to electricity.

Recently, Riders for Health, an international aid group focused on sub-Saharan countries in Africa, was noted for providing enough health-care vehicles for the entire country. Riders for Health manage and maintain vehicles for the government. The initiative addresses a major barrier to universal health care—transport—and allows health workers to visit three times as many villages every week.

References